Philbrick is a locational surname of British origin. An alternative spelling is Philbrook. The surname spread to America when Thomas Philbrick emigrated to Massachusetts in 1633. The name may refer to:

Clancy Philbrick (born 1986), American artist
David Philbrick Conner (born 1949), American businessman
Donald Philbrick (1937-2022), American politician
Frank Philbrick (born 1978), American writer
George A. Philbrick (1913–1974), American engineer
Herbert Philbrick (1915–1993), American businessman
Inigo Philbrick (born 1987/1988), American art dealer and convicted fraudster
John Dudley Philbrick (1818–1886), American educator
Joseph Philbrick Webster (1819–1875), American musician
Nathaniel Philbrick (born 1956), American writer
Rodman Philbrick (born 1951), American writer
Stephen Philbrick (born 1949), American writer

See also
Philbrook

References

Surnames of British Isles origin